Miss Malaysia Universe 1973, the 7th edition of the Miss Universe Malaysia, was held at the Merlin Hotel, Kuala Lumpur. Margaret Loo of Selangor was crowned by the outgoing titleholder, Helen Looi of Penang at the end of the event. She then represented Malaysia at the Miss Universe 1973 pageant in Athens, Greece.

Results

Delegates 
  - Angela Lee
  - Kim Ai Thing
  - Sharifah Hamiza Syed Abu Bakar
  - Liza Saw
  - Sandra Yeo
  - Rosalina Yahil Ahmad (Also competed in previous year, won Miss Malaysia Asia Quest 1972)
  - Evelyn Thum Lin Chee
  - Shirley Cheong
  - Noor Fauziah Ibrahim
  - Raja Khatijah Raja Kamal
  - Marleng Shawn
  - Margaret Loo Tai Tai
  - Rahani Haji Mahgan

References

External links 

1973 in Malaysia
1973 beauty pageants
1973
Beauty pageants in Malaysia